Thomas Lechenore was the member of the Parliament of England for Marlborough for the parliament of 1393.

References 

Members of Parliament for Marlborough
English MPs 1393
Year of birth unknown
Year of death unknown